James C. Watkins (1951 - ) was born in Louisville, Kentucky, in 1951 and raised in a farming family in Athens, Alabama. He is a ceramic artist living in Lubbock, Texas who has worked with clay for over 40 years. He is known for his large scale double-walled ceramic vessels and laser cut porcelain substrate  tiles. He is recognized for his textured surfaces, created by using alternative firing techniques. His porcelain substrate tiles are fumed   with stannous chloride and multi-fired using ferric chloride, gold and platinum luster to achieve colorful surfaces.

Watkins gained recognition through his inclusion in the 1993 White House Collection of American Crafts, which was curated by Michael Monroe, who was then the director of the Renwick Gallery of the Smithsonian Institution. Watkins' work is held in 21 permanent collections, including the Clinton Library  in Little Rock, Arkansas, the Shigaraki Institute of Ceramic Studies  in Shigaraki, Japan, the Everson Museum  in Syracuse, New York, the Tweed Museum  in Duluth, Minnesota, and the Eiteljorg Museum  in Indianapolis, Indiana. His work has been widely exhibited in 40 solo exhibitions and 164 group exhibitions.

Academic and instructional position
Watkins is a Paul Whitfield Horn Professor  Emeritus in the College of Architecture at Texas Tech University in Lubbock, Texas where he taught Architectural Ceramics and Architectural Drawing. The Horn Professorship is the highest honor that Texas Tech University bestows on members of its faculty. Horn Professorships are granted to professors in recognition of national and international distinction for outstanding research or other creative scholarly achievements.

Personal background
Watkins uses his experience of growing up in the rural south during the 1950s and 60s as a source of inspiration for his signature work. His mother and father were farmers. Watkins is the oldest of six children - three boys and three girls. He grew up in a time when large cast-iron pots were still used as an essential farming utensil. His mother made soap, hominy and souse in the large black cast-iron pots. Watkins creates large double-walled ceramics forms that are inspired by the memory of helping his mother keep the fire burning hot around the cast-iron pots.

Awards
Watkins has been honored for his contributions to the arts and teaching.
1990 The President's Excellence in Teaching Award, Texas Tech University.
2005 Senior Fulbright Scholar Fellowship, Vietnam, (teaching at the Ho Chi Minh City University of Architecture).
2013 William D. Kerns Award for the Visual Arts.
2016 Art on the Llano Estacado Legacy Award, presented by Texas Tech University Museum Association 
2019 Texas Master Award given by the Houston Center for Contemporary Craft

Education
1973 Kansas City Art Institute, Ceramics/Drawing, B.F.A
1977 Indiana University-Bloomington, Ceramics, M.F.A

Publications by James C. Watkins
Architectural Delineation Presentation Techniques and Projects 1st ed.,  James T. Davis, James C. Watkins; Published by Kendall/Hunt Publishing Company, 2000, 168 pages  (paperback)
Architectural Delineation Presentation Techniques and Projects 2nd ed., James T. Davis, James C. Watkins; Published by Kendall Hunt Publishing Company, 2001, 168 pages  (paperback) Find this book
Alternative Kilns & Firing Techniques, James C. Watkins, Paul Andrew Wandless; Published by Lark Books, a division of Sterling Publishing Company, 2004, 127 pages   (hardcover)  (paperback) Find this book
Niedrigbrand, (German translation of Alternative Kiln & Firing Techniques), James C. Watkins, Paul Andrew Wandless; Published by Lark Books, a division of Sterling Publishing Company, 2005, 127 pages  (hardcover) Find this book
Reflections Made of Memories, James C. Watkins; Distributed by Kendall/Hunt Publishing Company, 2019, 118 pages  (hardcover) Find this book

Publications about James C. Watkins' life and art
A Meditation of Fire The Art of James C. Watkins, by Kippra D. Hopper; Publish by Texas Tech University Press, 1999, 136 pages  (hardcover) Find this book

External links
Blog with selections of James Watkins' works

Gallery

References

American Ceramics, Glen R. Brown. 2001.
The Studio Potter, James Watkins, "Remembrance", Summer/Fall Issue 1996.

1951 births
Living people
African-American artists
Artists from Louisville, Kentucky
People from Athens, Alabama
21st-century African-American people
20th-century African-American people
African-American ceramists